Sukurčy (polish : Sukurcze) near Lida in Belarus is a former village and the estate of Witold Pilecki. It was destroyed by communists after the Second World War.

References

Former villages
Lida
Belarus in World War II